Sebastião Ribeiro Salgado Júnior (born February 8, 1944) is a Brazilian social documentary photographer and photojournalist.

He has traveled in over 120 countries for his photographic projects. Most of these have appeared in numerous press publications and books. Touring exhibitions of his work have been presented throughout the world.

Salgado is a UNICEF Goodwill Ambassador. He was awarded the W. Eugene Smith Memorial Fund Grant in 1982, Foreign Honorary Membership of the American Academy of Arts and Sciences in 1992 and the Royal Photographic Society's Centenary Medal and Honorary Fellowship (HonFRPS) in 1993. He has been a member of the Académie des Beaux-Arts at the Institut de France since April 2016.

Early life and education
Salgado was born on February 8, 1944, in Aimorés, in the state of Minas Gerais, Brazil. After a somewhat itinerant childhood, Salgado trained as an economist, earning a BA degree from UFES, a master's degree from the University of São Paulo in Brazil, and a PhD from University of Paris.

He began work as an economist for the International Coffee Organization, often traveling to Africa on missions for the World Bank.

Photography
It was on his travels to Africa that he first started seriously taking photographs. He chose to abandon a career as an economist and switched to photography in 1973, working initially on news assignments before veering more towards documentary-type work. Salgado initially worked with the photo agency Sygma and the Paris-based Gamma, but in 1979, he joined the international cooperative of photographers Magnum Photos. He left Magnum in 1994 and with his wife Lélia Wanick Salgado formed his own agency, Amazonas Images, in Paris, to represent his work. He is particularly noted for his social documentary photography of workers in less developed nations. His work resides in Paris.

Salgado works on long term, self-assigned projects, many of which have been published as books: The Other Americas, Sahel, Workers, Migrations, and Genesis. The latter three are mammoth collections with hundreds of images each from all around the world. His most famous pictures are of a gold mine in Brazil called Serra Pelada.  He has also been a UNICEF Goodwill Ambassador since 2001.

Between 2004 and 2011, Salgado worked on Genesis, aiming at the presentation of the unblemished faces of nature and humanity. It consists of a series of photographs of landscapes and wildlife, as well as of human communities that continue to live in accordance with their ancestral traditions and cultures. This body of work is conceived as a potential path to humanity's rediscovery of itself in nature.

In September and October 2007, Salgado displayed his photographs of coffee workers from India, Guatemala, Ethiopia and Brazil at the Brazilian Embassy in London. The aim of the project was to raise public awareness of the origins of the popular drink.

Salgado has photographed the landscape and people of the Amazon rainforest (Amazónia) in Brazil.

Salgado and his work are the focus of the film The Salt of the Earth (2014), directed by Wim Wenders and Salgado's son, Juliano Ribeiro Salgado, and produced by Lélia Wanick Salgado.

Environmentalism

Together, Lélia and Sebastião have worked since the 1990s on the restoration of a part of the Atlantic Forest in Brazil. In 1998, they succeeded in turning 17,000 acres into a nature reserve and created the Instituto Terra. The institute is dedicated to a mission of reforestation, conservation and environmental education.

Awards
 1982: W. Eugene Smith Grant from the W. Eugene Smith Memorial Fund
 1985: Oskar Barnack Award
 1989: Hasselblad Award, Hasselblad Foundation, Gothenburg, Sweden
 1992: Oskar Barnack Award
 1992: Foreign Honorary Member of the American Academy of Arts and Sciences
 1993: Centenary Medal from the Royal Photographic Society
 1993: Honorary Fellowship (HonFRPS) from the Royal Photographic Society
 1994: Grand Prix National French Ministry of Culture, Ministry of Culture (France)
 1998: Prince of Asturias Awards, Arts category
 1988: King of Spain International Journalism Award
 2003: International Award from the Photographic Society of Japan
 2007: M2-El Mundo People's Choice Award for best exhibition a PhotoEspaña, for Africa
 2019: Peace Prize of the German Book Trade
 2021: Crystal Award, World Economic Forum
 2021: Praemium Imperiale

Honours
: Commander of the Order of Rio Branco (2004)
: Knight of the Legion of Honour (2016)
: Commander of the Ordre des Arts et des Lettres (2014)
: Knight of the Order of Cultural Merit (Monaco) (2018)

Publications

 An Uncertain Grace. Essays by Eduardo Galeano and Fred Ritchin.
 
 
 Workers: Archaeology of the Industrial Age.
 
 
 
 
 
 
 The Children: Refugees and Migrants. New York, NY: Aperture, 2000. .
 Sahel: The End of the Road. Oakland, CA: University of California Press, 2004. .
 Africa. Cologne: Taschen, 2007. .
 Genesis. Cologne: Taschen, 2013. .
 From my Land to the Planet. Roma: Contrasto, 2014. .
 The Scent of a Dream: Travels in the World of Coffee. New York: Abrams, 2015. .
 Kuwait. A Desert on Fire. Cologne: Taschen, 2016. .
 Gold. Cologne: Taschen, 2019. Edited by Lélia Wanick Salgado. .
 Amazônia. Cologne: Taschen, 2021. Edited by Lélia Wanick Salgado. .

Filmography
 The Salt of the Earth (2014). Documentary about and with Salgado, directed by Wim Wenders and Salgado's son Juliano Ribeiro Salgado.

Exhibitions

Genesis, Royal Ontario Museum, Toronto, Canada, 2013; Natural History Museum, London, 2013; Maison Européenne de la Photographie, Paris, 2013–14; National Museum of Singapore, 2014; Palácio das Artes, Belo Horizonte, Brazil, 2014; Fotografiska, Stockholm, 2014; Palazzo della Ragione, Milan, Italy, 2014; International Center of Photography, New York City, 2014–15; CaixaForum Barcelona, Barcelona, Spain, 2014–15; Sejong Center, Seoul, South Korea, 2014–15; Cordoaria Nacional, Lisbon, Portugal, 2015; CaixaForum Palma, Palma, Spain, 2015; Amerika Haus Berlin, Berlin, 2015; Power Station of Art, Shanghai, China, 2015; Kunstfoyer Munich, Germany, October 2015 - January 2016; Prague Castle, Prague, Czech Republic, 2017; Nederlands Fotomuseum, Rotterdam, Netherlands, 2017.
 Déclaration, Musée de l'Homme, Paris, 2018–19
Amazônia, Philharmonie de Paris, 20 March – 31 October 2021

References

External links

Instituto Terra
Amazonas Images Photo agency formed by Salgado and his wife Lélia Wanick.
Biography at The Guardian
'Sebastião Salgado: The silent drama of photography' TED Talk (17 minute video)
"Back to Nature, in Pictures and Action," New York Times, 2009
"Genesis by Sebastião Salgado: Exhibition Review", Huffington Post UK, 2013
Sebastião Salgado at Encyclopædia Britannica

Brazilian photographers
Fine art photographers
Social documentary photographers
1944 births
Living people
Magnum photographers
Brazilian journalists
Brazilian socialists
University of São Paulo alumni
20th-century Brazilian people
21st-century Brazilian people
Expatriate photographers in Sudan
University of Paris alumni
Commandeurs of the Ordre des Arts et des Lettres
Chevaliers of the Légion d'honneur
Culture in Minas Gerais